USS Yellowstone may refer to more than one United States Navy ship:

 , a cargo ship in commission from 1918 to 1919
 , a destroyer tender in commission from 1946 to 1974
 , a destroyer tender in commission from 1980 to 1996

United States Navy ship names